Sandun Rathnatunga (born 21 December 1990) is a Sri Lankan cricketer. He made his List A debut for Anuradhaura District in the 2016–17 Districts One Day Tournament on 22 March 2017.

References

External links
 

1990 births
Living people
Sri Lankan cricketers
Anuradhaura District cricketers
Bloomfield Cricket and Athletic Club cricketers
Kalutara Physical Culture Centre cricketers
Saracens Sports Club cricketers